Root Fire is the debut album from the Canadian rock band Bedouin Soundclash, made while the members of the band were still in school at Queen's University.

Track listing 
All songs were written by Bedouin Soundclash.
"Rodigan State Address" – 0:52
"Rebel Rouser" – 6:44
"Dub in the Kalamegdan" – 4:06
"Johnny Go to New York" – 5:08
"Back to the Matter" – 2:34
"Eloween Deowen" – 6:12
"Santa Monica" – 4:20
"Mandrake Root" – 3:49
"Natural Right (Rude Bwoy)" – 2:57
"National Water" – 4:04

Personnel 
Jay Malinowski: vocals and guitar
Eon Sinclair: Bass guitar
Brett Dunlop: percussion
Pat Pengelly: drums
Rob Bailey: Bongo and maracas

Credits 
All songs written by Bedouin Soundclash
Album recorded at Rainy Day Studios, May 2001
Cover art and design by Jay Malinowski

References 

Bedouin Soundclash albums
2001 debut albums